Lake Alta is a glacial lake in The Remarkables near Queenstown in the South Island of New Zealand. It is approximately 500 metres by 250 metres in size and freezes over in the winter months. At this time it is used by skiers and snowboarders. It is used by divers who hold an annual ice dive there, as well as Antarctica New Zealand diver pre deployment training.

References

Lakes of Otago